The 1990–91 season was Fulham's 96th season as a professional football club in the Football League. They competed in the Third Division for the fifth successive season.

Prior to the start of the season, manager Ray Lewington was demoted to assistant manager and replaced by Alan Dicks. Fulham finished in 21st place in the table, narrowly avoiding relegation to the Fourth Division. In the FA Cup they reached the second round, beating Farnborough Town in the first round but losing a second round replay against Cambridge. They were knocked out in the first round of the Football League Cup by Peterborough United

Fourth Division

Pld = Matches played; W = Matches won; D = Matches drawn; L = Matches lost; F = Goals for; A = Goals against; GD = Goal difference; Pts = Points

Results summary

FA Cup

Rumbelows Cup

Leyland DAF Trophy

Squad statistics

Transfers

In

Out

Notes and references
General

Fulham F.C. seasons
Fulham